Thomas Eichin (born 9 October 1966) is a retired German football player. He was the general manager of the German DEL ice hockey club Kölner Haie. On 15 February 2013, he took over the job as general manager of Werder Bremen. After been laid off in May 2016, he took over the job as the sports director of 1860 Munich.

References

Honours
 DFB-Pokal finalist: 1991–92

External links
 

1966 births
Living people
German footballers
Bundesliga players
2. Bundesliga players
Borussia Mönchengladbach players
1. FC Nürnberg players
Association football defenders
Freiburger FC players